Simplifly,  DBA (formerly known as Deccan Aviation Lanka and Millennium Airlines) is a charter airline based in Colombo, Sri Lanka operating helicopters, fixed-wing aircraft and seaplanes.

History 
Millennium Airlines was incorporated in July 2004 as Deccan Aviation Lanka, a private helicopter operator in partnership between Deccan Aviation of India and the Favourite Group of Sri Lanka. Suren Mirchandani was the first accountable manager and launched with Deccan Indian pilot Capt AP singh as the chief pilot.soon two Sri Lankan Pilots Sqn Ldr Rtd Kapila Ratnasekera and Capt Ravi Dharmawickrama from Deccan India replaced Indian Pilots.Initial helicopter was a Bell 206III Jetranger registered 4R-DLK.

By early 2007 the company started fixed-wing charter operations with the introduction of a leased Beechcraft 1900 aircraft from JS Air Pakistan.

Millennium Airlines (Formerly Deccan Aviation Lanka) provides air taxi services to the tourism industry based in Colombo. In January 2008, Millennium Airlines launched an airborne medical evacuation service. In May 2011, it introduced the eight seater Gippsland GA8 aircraft and expanded its fleet with the addition of the Cessna T206H amphibious aircraft in December 2012. In 2016 a pre-owned Robinson R66 was introduced and soon the existing Bell 206BIII was sold overseas.

Deccan Aviation (India), now known as Deccan Charters Ltd, exited from the company in November 2011, after selling their equity to Singapore-based Millennium Aero Pte. Ltd, which prompted the company to rebrand as "Simplifly" with effect from 2013.

In 2019 April Millennium Airlines discontinued flying operations indefinitely for unknown reasons but retained the sole Robinson R66 in its fleets.

Destinations

Current fleet

Aircraft operated

References

External links 
 Official website

Airlines of Sri Lanka
Airlines established in 2004
Seaplane operators
Sri Lankan companies established in 2004